Sergio Augusto Magaña Martínez (2 December 1949 – 25 December 2017) was a Mexican politician affiliated with the Party of the Democratic Revolution (formerly to the Institutional Revolutionary Party). From 2014 to 2017 he served as Deputy of the LIX Legislature of the Mexican Congress as a plurinominal representative and as Senator of the LVI and LVII Legislatures.

He also was Mayor of Morelia from 1993 to 1994.

See also
 List of municipal presidents of Morelia

References

1949 births
2017 deaths
People from Morelia
Politicians from Michoacán
Members of the Senate of the Republic (Mexico)
Members of the Chamber of Deputies (Mexico)
Institutional Revolutionary Party politicians
Party of the Democratic Revolution politicians
Universidad Michoacana de San Nicolás de Hidalgo alumni
20th-century Mexican politicians
21st-century Mexican politicians